Thomas Sinnickson (December 13, 1786 – February 17, 1873) was an American jurist and statesman from Salem, New Jersey. He represented New Jersey in the United States House of Representatives in 1828–1829. He was a judge of the court of errors and appeals of New Jersey, and a judge of the court of common pleas for twenty years.

He was the nephew of Congressman Thomas Sinnickson (1744–1817)

He was interred at St. John's Episcopal Cemetery in Salem, New Jersey.

References

External links

1786 births
1873 deaths
Burials at St. John's Episcopal Cemetery, Salem, New Jersey
National Republican Party members of the United States House of Representatives from New Jersey
19th-century American politicians